Nigeria's Got Talent is a Nigerian reality talent show which is part of the Got Talent franchise. It was launched in 2012 on television stations like AIT and NTA, and sponsored by thriving telecommunication company Airtel.

Hosted by Andre blaze former presenter on Nigeria's Got Talent's fore-runner The Peak Talent Show, the judges are actress Kate Henshaw, comedian Yibo Koko, and radio presenter Dan Foster, who had previously held a similar position on Idols West Africa.

The current champions are dancing duo Robots for Christ.

Format
The auditions take place in front of the judges and a live audience in different Nigerian cities. As the contestant performs, each judge may show their disapproval by pressing a buzzer which lights a red 'X' near above the stage. If all three buzzers are pressed, the act ends immediately. To advance to the second round, auditionees must receive at least two 'yes's' or the competition ends for them. After the auditions the judges have to whittle successful acts down to fifty, and all performers are called back to discover if they have progressed to the next round.

The remaining acts from across the country perform at the live semi-finals, with the two most popular acts from each semi-finals winning a position in the final, and judges may still end a performance early with all three 'X's' buzzed. After the acts have performed, phone lines open and the voting process begins, after which the votes are counted and the act with the highest number of public votes is automatically placed in the final. The judges then choose between the second and third most popular acts, with the winner of the most votes automatically gaining a place in the final where the winner of Nigeria's Got Talent is chosen once again by the public vote and will receive 10 million dollars

Throughout the whole competition, the judges express their views on each act's performance.

The golden buzzer is not seen in this version so all act must make though If they receive two yes and progressed to the semi finals and they can't automatically go through to the semi-finals

Season 1

Auditions were held in Abuja, Calabar, Benin, Port Harcourt, Ibadan, Enugu, and Lagos where the grand finale was held. As with the British and American versions of the show, applicants were invited to upload video performances onto the show's website which were viewed by producers, and outstanding contestants were called to perform in front of the judges at the main auditions.

The top ten finalists were:

Season 2
The second series of the show was aired on 8 November 2013, with all three judges returning. After rigorous auditions across the cities in Nigeria, it concluded on 8 February 2014 with Robots for Christ winning the second season. The highlights of the finale was posted to YouTube on 9 February 2014.

Criticism
Although Henshaw has been promoted as the show's mean judge à la Simon Cowell, she has been criticized for going too far. At Season Two's Port Harcourt auditions, she interrupted a singer credited as Heaven by stating, "There is no heaven here. Stop singing and get off the stage, or else  I will leave to call your father as the judge".

References

2012 Nigerian television series debuts
Got Talent
Nigerian reality television series
Television series by Fremantle (company)
2012 establishments in Nigeria
Non-British television series based on British television series
Nigerian Television Authority original programming
Africa Independent Television original programming